Donovan R. Walton (born May 25, 1994) is an American professional baseball infielder in the San Francisco Giants organization. He played college baseball for the Oklahoma State Cowboys. Walton was drafted by the Seattle Mariners in the 5th round of the 2016 MLB draft. He made his MLB debut for the Mariners in 2019 and has also played for the San Francisco Giants.

Amateur career
Walton attended Bishop Kelley High School in Tulsa, Oklahoma. He was drafted by the New York Mets in the 36th round of the 2012 MLB draft, but did not sign. 

Walton attended Oklahoma State University, where he played college baseball for the Cowboys, playing primarily shortstop, along with a number of games at second base. In 2014 and 2015 he played collegiate summer baseball in the Cape Cod Baseball League for the Yarmouth-Dennis Red Sox, where he was named East Division MVP of the league's all-star game and co-MVP of the playoffs in Yarmouth-Dennis' 2015 championship season.

Walton was drafted by the Milwaukee Brewers in the 23rd round of the 2015 MLB draft, but did not sign and instead returned to OSU for his senior season. In 2016 in his senior season he batted .337/.428/.447. He was drafted by the Seattle Mariners in the 5th round of the 2016 MLB draft, after being noted for his plus glove and his ability to get on base, and signed with them.

Professional career

Seattle Mariners
Walton played for the Low-A Everett AquaSox in 2016, hitting .281/.361/.421 with five home runs and 23 RBIs in 178 at bats as he played shortstop and second base. He was named a 2016 Northwest League mid-season All Star. He split the 2017 season between the AZL Mariners and the High-A Modesto Nuts, hitting a combined .271/.350/.388 with four home runs and 29 RBIs in 258 at bats. He was named a 2017 MiLB organization All Star.

In 2018, he split the season between Modesto and the AA Arkansas Travelers, hitting a combined .273/.365/.381 with four home runs and 41 RBIs in 425 at bats, while primarily playing second base. He was named a 2018 California League Northern Division mid-season All Star, and a 2018 MiLB organization All Star. 

He returned to Arkansas for the 2019 minor league season, hitting .300/.390/.427 with 72 runs (7th in the Texas League), 11 home runs, 50 RBIs, 10 hit by pitch (3rd), 63 walks (2nd), and 75 strikeouts in 490 at bats, while primarily playing shortstop (where he had a .990 fielding percentage). He was awarded a 2019 MiLB Gold Glove, earned the Rawlings Minor League Gold Glove Award at shortstop, named a Texas League mid-season All Star, and named an MiLB organization All Star.

The Mariners selected Walton's contract and promoted him to the major leagues on September 10, 2019. He made his major league debut that night as a defensive replacement versus the Cincinnati Reds. In 2020 in the major leagues, Walton recorded 2 hits in 13 at bats across 5 games.

On May 31, 2021, Walton hit his first career home run, a three-run shot off of James Kaprielian of the Oakland Athletics. In 2021 with AAA Tacoma he batted .304/.395/.519 with a career-high 13 home runs in 283 at bats. In 2021 with Seattle he batted .206/.254/.365 in 63 at bats.
	
In 2022 with AAA Tacoma he batted .294/.368/.510 in 51 at bats.

San Francisco Giants
On May 11, 2022, the Mariners traded Walton to the San Francisco Giants for pitcher Prelander Berroa.
 He was assigned to the Triple-A Sacramento River Cats.

and split time between the Giants and River Cats.

On June 5, 2022, Walton hit his first career grand slam off of Braxton Garrett of the Miami Marlins. In 2022, with the Giants he batted .158/.180/.303 in 76 at-bats, playing 14 games at second base, 12 at shortstop, and one at pitcher. With Sacramento he batted .225/.345/.352 in 71 at-bats, playing seven games each at second base and shortstop, four each at left field and DH, and one at third base. On November 18, he was non-tendered and became a free agent. 

On December 6, 2022, Walton re-signed with the Giants on a minor league contract. On February 26, 2023, it was announced that Walton would miss the first month of the season after undergoing shoulder surgery in the offseason.

Personal life
Walton’s father, Rob also played baseball at Oklahoma State prior to a minor league career with the Baltimore Orioles, eventually returning to OSU to serve as the pitching coach. His brother, Davis played football at the  University of Tulsa.

References

External links

Oklahoma State Cowboys bio

1994 births
Living people
Baseball players from Dallas
Major League Baseball infielders
Seattle Mariners players
San Francisco Giants players
Oklahoma State Cowboys baseball players
Yarmouth–Dennis Red Sox players
Arizona League Mariners players
Everett AquaSox players
Modesto Nuts players
Arkansas Travelers players
Tacoma Rainiers players